Band-e-Amir Dragons ( Band-e-Amīr Khāmārān / Shāmārān) or Band-e-Amir Region is one of eight regional first-class cricket teams in Afghanistan. In the 2017 Shpageeza team auction, the Band-e-Amir Dragons team was bought by Paragon Business Group, a Finance and investment company, and it will play as the Paragon Band-e-Amir Dragons in this competition. The Region represents the following provinces in the centre of Afghanistan: Ghazni, Bamyan, Daykundi, and Maidan Wardak. The team is named after Band-e Amir, a series of six deep blue lakes in Bamyan Province.

Band-e-Amir Region compete in the Ahmad Shah Abdali 4-day Tournament, which has had first-class status from 2017 onwards. In October 2017, they lost their opening fixture of the tournament, against Mis Ainak Region, by 262 runs.

They also play in the Ghazi Amanullah Khan Regional One Day Tournament, which was granted List A status from 2017. and the Afghan Shpageeza Cricket League Twenty20 competition (which has Twenty20 status from 2017) using the name Band-e-Amir Dragons.

References 

Cricket in Afghanistan
Afghan first-class cricket teams